Khatri Addouh  (born 1954) is a former president of the Sahrawi Arab Democratic Republic and the president of the Sahrawi National Council from 2010 to 2020. He was appointed as the Acting President and the Secretary General of the Polisario Front upon the death of his long time aide President Mohamed Abdelaziz on 31 May 2016.

Career
Addouh is a member of the National Secretariat of the Polisario Front. He served in the Polisario Front Orientation Department. He also served as the Wali of Es Semara till August 2010. He became the President of the Sahrawi National Council on 10 July 2010. He replaced Mahfoud Ali Beiba, whose death was attributed by SADR to a heart attack, while Moroccan media claimed that Beiba was assassinated to make way for Addouh.

He was subsequently re-elected to the same post on 24 February 2014 and then again for a third term on 19 March 2016. Addouh became the acting president when Mohamed Abedlaziz, who was the president for 40 years since 1976 died on 31 May 2016. Addouh convened the 2300 strong delegate council at Dakhla, which elected Brahim Ghali as the new president of the Sahrawi Arab Democratic Republic.

Addouh also heads the negotiating team of the Polisario Front in various international organisations. Addouh and his loyalists are working towards gaining an observer status at the United Nations, which will enable the Polisario Front government to stake claim as the legitimate representative of the Sahrawi people.

In January 2022, Addouh met with Staffan de Mistura, the United Nations Secretary‑General's Personal Envoy for Western Sahara, at the resumption of peace talks.

References

Living people
Polisario Front politicians
Presidents of the Sahrawi Arab Democratic Republic
1954 births
Western Sahara conflict